Come Sunday is a 2018 American drama film based on the excommunication of Carlton Pearson, directed by Joshua Marston from a screenplay by Marcus Hinchey. It stars Chiwetel Ejiofor, Jason Segel, Condola Rashad, Lakeith Stanfield, Stacey Sargeant, Vondie Curtis-Hall, Danny Glover, and Martin Sheen.

The film had its world premiere at the Sundance Film Festival on January 21, 2018, and was released in the United States on April 13, 2018, by Netflix.

Plot

Evangelist Carlton Pearson is ostracized by his church and excommunicated for preaching that there is no Hell.

Cast
 Chiwetel Ejiofor as Carlton Pearson
 Martin Sheen as Oral Roberts
 Condola Rashad as Gina Pearson, Carlton's wife
 Jason Segel as Henry
 Danny Glover as Quincy Pearson, Carlton's imprisoned uncle
 Lakeith Stanfield as Reggie
 Allie McCulloch as Lawyer
 Joni Bovill as Yvette Flunder
 Stacey Sargeant as Nicky Brown
 Vondie Curtis-Hall as J. D. Ellis
 Dustin Lewis as Ron
 Ric Reitz as Richard Roberts
 Greg Lutz as Pat Robertson

Production
In July 2010, it was announced Marc Forster would produce and direct the film, with James D. Stern producing the film under his Endgame Entertainment banner. While Ira Glass will also produce alongside Alissa Shipp under their This American Life banner. In May 2014, it was announced Robert Redford and Jeffrey Wright had been cast in the film, while Jonathan Demme would direct the film, with Forster only serving as an executive producer. In July 2016, it was announced Joshua Marston would now direct the film, with Chiwetel Ejiofor joining the cast of the film and Netflix distributing the film. In September 2016, Danny Glover joined the cast of the film. In December 2016, Condola Rashad, Lakeith Stanfield and Martin Sheen joined the cast of the film, with Sheen replacing Redford. In January 2017, Stacey Sargeant joined the cast of the film.

Filming
Principal photography began in January 2017.

Release
The film had its world premiere at the Sundance Film Festival on January 21, 2018. It was released on April 13, 2018, on Netflix.

Critical response
The website's critical consensus reads, "Come Sunday benefits greatly from Chiwetel Ejiofor's central performance, which is often enough to lift an otherwise uneven drama." On Metacritic, the film has a weighted average score of 65 out of 100, based on 14 critics, indicating "generally favorable reviews".

David Rooney of The Hollywood Reporter wrote: "The movie's pounding heart is the remarkable Ejiofor. Imbuing his role with authority, charisma, mighty strength and wrenching human frailty, he's enough to make believers of all of us."
Peter Debruge of Variety wrote: "Marston, working from Marcus Hinchey’s sensitive and remarkably nuanced script, invites measured introspection from both his characters and the audience."

See also
 List of black films of the 2010s

References

External links
 

2018 films
American drama films
English-language Netflix original films
Films directed by Joshua Marston
Films scored by Tamar-kali
Films about Christianity
Drama films based on actual events
2018 drama films
This American Life
2010s English-language films
2010s American films